Coleman Hawkins and Confrères is an album by saxophonist Coleman Hawkins which was recorded in 1958 (with one track from 1957) and released on the Verve label.

Reception

AllMusic gave the album 3 stars.

Track listing
All compositions by Coleman Hawkins except where noted.
 "Maria" – 6:31
 "Cocktails for Two" (Arthur Johnston, Sam Coslow) – 2:39
 "Sunday" (Chester Conn, Jule Styne, Bennie Krueger, Ned Miller) – 5:19
 "Hanid" – 4:50
 "Honey Flower" – 8:42
 "Nabob" – 9:29
 "Honey Flower" [Alternate Take] – 8:15 Additional track on CD release
Recorded in Los Angeles, CA on October 16, 1957 (track 1) and in New York City on February 7, 1958 (tracks 2-7)

Personnel
Coleman Hawkins – tenor saxophone
Roy Eldridge – trumpet (tracks 2-7)
Ben Webster – tenor saxophone (track 1)
Hank Jones (tracks 2-7), Oscar Peterson (track 1) – piano
Herb Ellis – guitar (track 1)
Ray Brown (track 1), George Duvivier (tracks 2-7) – bass
Mickey Sheen (tracks 2-7), Alvin Stoller (track 1) – drums

References

Coleman Hawkins albums
1958 albums
Verve Records albums
Albums produced by Norman Granz